Loga may refer to:

People
 Bob Loga (1940–1996), American stock car racing official
  (1859-1911), Prussian politician
 Iarlaithe mac Loga, also known as Saint Jarlath
 Ignacy Loga-Sowiński (1914–1992), Polish trade union activist and politician
 Loga Ramin Torkian (born 1964), Iranian musician
 Paul Loga (born 1969), Cameroonian football player

Places
 , Germany
 , Germany
 Loga, Niger
 
 Loga Park, Rostov, Russia

Other
 loga, each of the 7 upper worlds (seven logas) in Ayyavazhi mythology